Nacher Putul is a Bangladeshi drama film, directed by Ashok Ghosh. Story by Ahmed Zaman Chowdhury and script and dialogue by Jahirul Haque. The film produced by Azizur Rahman under the banner of Rana Films. The film stars Razzak and Shabnam played in the lead role. The music was composed by Robin Ghosh (brother of Ashok Ghosh and husband of Shabnam). Khan Zainul, Sultana Zaman, Rani Sarkar, Inam Ahmed and Kazi Mehfuzul Haq also starred in the supporting roles.

Cast
 Shabnam - Laila
 Razzak - Firoz
 Khan Joynul - Kamal, brother of Laila
 Sultana Zaman - Shirin, Feroze's sister
 Rani Sarkar - Nina
 Supriya - Rubina
 Sabita - Feroze's sister
 Narayan Chakraborty - Laila's father
 Kazi Mehfuzul Haque - Feroze's elder brother
 Inam Ahmed - Nina's father
 Anis - Ruby's father
 Tejen Chakraborty
 Kamal
 Shathi Khandaker
 Master Tarek - Bablu, Laila's younger brother
 Master Nipu - Shopkeeper

Music
The film music is directed by Robin Ghosh. The soundtrack for the film is composed by Mohammad Moniruzzaman, KG Mustafa and Ahmed Zaman Chowdhury. The film singer are Sabina Yasmin, Abdul Jabbar, Mahmudunnabi and Shimul Yusuf.

Track list

References

External links
 

1971 films
Bangladeshi black-and-white films
Bengali-language Pakistani films
Bangladeshi drama films
Films scored by Robin Ghosh
1970s Bengali-language films
1971 drama films